The 2020 America East men's basketball tournament was the postseason men's basketball tournament for the America East Conference, which was held on March 7, 10, and canceled before its scheduled conclusion on March 14, 2020. All tournament games were played on home arenas of the higher-seeded school. The winner would have received the conference's automatic bid to the NCAA tournament, which itself was also cancelled to help curtail the spread of COVID-19.

Seeds
The top eight teams in the conference standings qualify for the tournament. The teams are seeded by record in conference, with a tiebreaker system to seed teams with identical conference records.

Schedule

Bracket and results
Teams are reseeded after each round with the highest remaining seeds receiving home-court advantage.

Game summaries

Quarterfinals

Semifinals

See also
 2020 America East women's basketball tournament

References

Tournament
America East Conference men's basketball tournament
America East men's basketball tournament
America East men's basketball tournament